The Dixie Lee Pea is an Heirloom variety of cowpea popular in the Carolinas, although prevalent throughout most of the American south.

History

Prelude
The centre of diversity of the cultivated cowpea is West Africa, leading an early consensus that this is the likely centre of origin and place of early domestication.  Charred remains of cowpeas have been found in rock shelters located in Central Ghana dating to the 2nd millennium BCE. By the 17th century cowpeas began to be cultivated in the New World via the Trans-Atlantic slave trade; being used as slave food and provisions.

Origin
The origin of the word Dixie is unknown but since its first use in 1859; it has referred to someone from the South, akin to the use of Yankee in the North. Like the name implies and similar to that of the history of the Iron and Clay pea it was a popular variety in the Confederate states of America. After the Civil War Dixie Lee peas kept many southerners from starving to death, prior to which cowpeas were solely reserved as livestock feed and slave food.

Cultivation
They prefer to grow in light sandy soils. They are harvested from June in North Carolina.

Culinary use
They are mainly grown for their medium-sized, edible bean. The pod is green in colour, slender and can be up to 7 inches long. When cooked the peas turn brown, and are very sweet to the taste. They can be used in various recipes including with Ham hock and onions, or on the barbeque.

See also
 Black-eyed pea
 Sea Island red pea
 Hoppin' John

References

Edible legumes
Cuisine of the Southern United States
Holiday foods
Culture of the African diaspora
Soul food
Historical foods in American cuisine
Vigna
Crops originating from Africa
Food plant cultivars
Nitrogen-fixing crops
Plant subspecies